Chanteius is a genus of mites in the Phytoseiidae family.

Species
 Chanteius apoensis (Schicha & Corpuz-Raros, 1992)
 Chanteius contiguus (Chant, 1959)
 Chanteius guangdongensis Wu & Lan, 1992
 Chanteius hainanensis Wu & Lan, 1992
 Chanteius makapalus (Schicha & Corpuz-Raros, 1992)
 Chanteius nabiyakus (Schicha & Corpuz-Raros, 1992)
 Chanteius parisukatus (Schicha & Corpuz-Raros, 1992)
 Chanteius separatus (Wu & Li, 1985)
 Chanteius tengi (Wu & Li, 1985)

References

Phytoseiidae